Teratornithidae is an extinct family of very large birds of prey that lived in North and South America from the Late Oligocene to Late Pleistocene. They include some of the largest known flying birds.

Taxonomy 
Teratornithidae are related to New World vultures (Cathartidae, syn. Vulturidae).
So far, at least seven species in six genera have been identified:

 Teratornis
 Teratornis merriami. This is by far the best-known species. Over a hundred specimens have been found, mostly from La Brea Tar Pits. It became extinct at the end of Pleistocene, some 10,000 years ago.
 Teratornis woodburnensis. The first species to be found north of the La Brea Tar Pits, this partial specimen was discovered at Legion Park, Woodburn, Oregon. The find dates to the Late Pleistocene, between 11,000 and 12,000 years ago, in a stratum which is filled with the bones of mastodons, sloths, and condors, and bears evidence of human habitation.
 Aiolornis incredibilis, previously known as Teratornis incredibilis. This species is fairly poorly known; finds from Nevada and California include several wing bones and part of the beak. The finds are dated from the Pliocene to the late Pleistocene, which is a considerable chronological spread, and thus it is uncertain whether they actually represent the same species.
 Cathartornis gracilis. This species is known only from a couple of leg bones found from La Brea Ranch. Compared to T. merriami, remains are slightly shorter and clearly more slender, indicating a more gracile build.
 Argentavis magnificens. A partial skeleton of this enormous teratorn was found from La Pampa, Argentina. It is one of the largest flying birds known to have existed, only likely exceeded by measurement of wingspan by Pelagornis sandersi, discovered in 1983. Fossil remains of this species have been dated to Late Miocene, about 6 to 8 million years ago, and one of the few teratorn finds in South America. Initial discovery included portions of the skull, incomplete humerus and several other wing bones.
 Another form, "Teratornis" olsoni, was described from the Pleistocene of Cuba, but its affinities are not completely resolved; it might not be a teratorn at all, but has also been placed in its own genus, Oscaravis. There are also undescribed fossils from southwestern Ecuador.
 Taubatornis campbelli is the earliest known teratorn species, from the Late Oligocene or Early Miocene of the Tremembé Formation, Taubaté Basin, Brazil.

Description and ecology 
Despite their size, there is little doubt that even the largest teratorns could fly. Visible marks of the attachments of contour feathers can be seen on Argentavis wing bones. This defies some earlier theories that modern condors, swans, and bustards represent the size limit for flying birds. The wing loading of Argentavis was relatively low for its size, a bit more than a turkey's, and if there were any significant wind present, the bird could probably get airborne merely by spreading its wings, just like modern albatrosses. South America during the Miocene probably featured strong and steady westerly winds, as the Andes were still forming and not yet very high.

T. merriami was small enough (relatively speaking) to take off with a simple jump and a few flaps. The fingerbones are mostly fused as in all birds, but the former index finger has partially evolved into a wide shelf at least in T. merriami, and as condors have a similar adaptation, probably in other species, too. Wing length estimates vary considerably but more likely than not were at the upper end of the range, because this bone structure bears the load of the massive primaries.

Studies on condor flight suggest that even the largest teratorns were capable of flight in normal conditions, as modern large soaring birds rarely flap their wings regardless of terrain.

Traditionally, teratorns have been described as large scavengers, very much like oversized condors, owing to considerable similarity with condors. However, the long beaks and wide gapes of teratorns are more like the beaks of eagles and other actively predatory birds than those of vultures. Most likely teratorns swallowed their prey whole; Argentavis could technically swallow up to hare-sized animals in a single piece. Although they undoubtedly engaged in opportunistic scavenging, they seem to have been active predators most of the time. Teratorns had relatively longer and stouter legs than Old World vultures; thus it seems possible that teratorns would stalk their prey on the ground (much like extant caracaras), and take off only to fly to another feeding ground or their nests; especially Cathartornis seems well-adapted for such a lifestyle. Argentavis may have been an exception, as its sheer bulk would have made it a less effective hunter, but better adapted to taking over other predators' kills. As teratorns were not habitual scavengers, they most likely had completely feathered heads, unlike vultures.

It should be noted, however, that the skull features of teratorns still share a lot of crucial similarities with specialized scavenging raptors. Many old world vultures possess large bills similar to teratorns, and a longer bill is in fact an anatomic feature that points toward a scavenging rather than a predatory life style, as this allow them to probe deeper into large carcases - larger than those fed upon by active-hunting raptors. Other anatomical features, such as the relatively small and sideward facing orbits and the lower skull, are also consistent with a scavenging live style. More sideward facing eyes allow scavenging raptors to have a wider field of vision, which is advantageous in spotting carcases. In contrast, predatory raptors usually have proportionally larger and more forward facing orbits, as depth perception is more important for a predatory lifestyle.  

As in other large birds, a clutch probably had only one or two eggs; the young would be cared for more than half a year, and take several years to reach maturity, probably up to 12 years in Argentavis.

References

External links 

 Vulture Territory Facts and Characteristics: Teratorns

 
Prehistoric bird families
†
New World vultures
Oligocene birds
Miocene birds
Pliocene birds
Pleistocene birds
Oligocene first appearances
Pleistocene extinctions
Neogene birds of North America
Neogene birds of South America
Pleistocene birds of North America
Pleistocene animals of South America
Taxa named by Loye H. Miller